Feadship (First Export Association of Dutch Shipbuilders) is a cooperative venture between two shipyards Royal Van Lent Shipyard and Koninklijke De Vries Scheepsbouw.
Feadship designs and constructs high-end luxury yachts and is one of the leading builders of custom superyachts such as Aquarius, Symphony, Savannah and Venus.

History
Feadship can trace its roots back to 1849, when the Akerboom family bought a small shipyard off the coast of the Netherlands to build and repair boats. They joined with the Van Lent family in 1927, and then in 1949 they founded Feadship  together with the De Vries, another family-based shipyard, to form Feadship.
Feadship has four shipyards:
Two owned by Koninklijke De Vries in Aalsmeer and Makkum. 
Two owned by Royal Van Lent in Amsterdam and one on the island of Kaag.
Both share the design and engineering center, De Voogt Naval Architects. 
 
After World War II the market for the previously successful industry was left in ruins. Even after four years of peace, there remained little money or inclination in Europe for ordering pleasure yachts. Encouraged by the Dutch government's export incentives, Feadship (First Export Association of Dutch Shipbuilders), was founded by naval architect Henri de Voogt in 1949 as an export association with the intention of selling to American clients. Several shipyards were members in the beginning:

 Scheepswerf De Vlijt/Gebr. de Vries, Aalsmeer
 Jacht & Scheepswerf Van Lent, Kaag
 Naval architects H.W. de Voogt joined in 1950
 Scheepswerf E.G. van de Stadt, Zaandam, left Feadship in 1953
 Scheepswerven Nicolaas Witsen & Vis, Alkmaar, left Feadship in 1957
 Scheepswerf Het Fort/G. de Vries Lentsch, Nieuwendam, left Feadship in 1958
 Jachtwerf W.P.M. Akerboom, Lisse, left Feadship in 1968

Feadship was officially launched at the 1951 New York Boat Show of 1951, which showcased the use of steel, a yacht technology unused then in North America for yachts. With orders now flowing for both steel and aluminum, by the mid-1950s Feadship stopped building yachts in wood. This started a series of mergers, leading to just three yards within the agreement by 1966.
 
The 1960s as a whole witnessed steady growth - both in the organization's reputation and the size of the vessels it built. 85–90 ft, 100–110 ft, 120 ft with fully raised wheelhouses, trans-Atlantic capabilities; various milestones in construction history were reached and surpassed. By the early 1970s however, Feadship's popularity had greatly increased, with several yachts being launched each year (see list below).

As the American economy boomed, Henry Ford and Malcolm Forbes were but two of a host of famous folk to take advantage of Feadship's custom-built yachts.

In 1977, a separate entity was established in the US in place of the customary representative agent. Don Kenniston was Feadship America's first general manager, a position he held until 2008. The Americas office is now managed by Ted McCumber.

Van Lent Shipyard was awarded a royal charter in 2001 and sister company De Vries Scheepsbouw received hers in 2006, each upon their hundredth anniversary, and the companies changed their names to reflect this. LVMH acquired Royal Van Lent in 2008.

The company

Locations
Hoofddorp: Feadship's headquarters and home to the design and engineering center, De Voogt Naval Architects.
Aalsmeer: Koninklijke De Vries Scheepsbouw's headquarters. The De Vries Group is dedicated to custom-built superyachts. This family business was awarded the designation ‘Koninklijk’ (Royal) at the time of its centenary in 2006.
Makkum: On a location used for shipbuilding since the early twentieth century, the ‘De Vries Scheepsbouw Makkum’ yard was opened in 2005. Due to its access to deep water, it is possible to build yachts of more than 120 metres. The giant 170-metre construction shed includes a massive dry dock.
Kaag: Royal Van Lent's headquarters. The yard has roots dating back to 1849. Yacht construction started eighty years ago when motor and sailing yachts were built out of wood. Royal Van Lent rapidly expanded into the construction of steel and aluminium, and is now solely dedicated to custom-built motor yachts and is responsible for an average of two launches per year. Facilities at the yard include two dry docks and two slipways for yachts of up to 100m in length.
Amsterdam: Royal Van Lent Shipyard opened its newest dock in early 2019 in Amsterdam's Westpoort area, where superyachts of up to 160 meters can be built. The new dock will also be used for refits of existing Feadship yachts. The yard is managed from Kaag and by the existing management.

List of yachts built

This is a list of all the yachts built by Feadship since 2006, sorted by year. For all Feadship yachts starting from 1920, please refer to the main list.

2006–2015

2016–present

Yachts under construction
On January 10, 2018 the yachtbuilder released their complete order book.

See also
List of shipbuilders and shipyards
List of motor yachts by length
Royal Huisman - another Dutch shipyard with a royal charter
Royal IHC - another Dutch shipyard with a royal charter

References

External links

 
 Feadship fleet
 Feadship heritage fleet

Dutch boat builders
Dutch brands
LVMH brands
Shipbuilding companies of the Netherlands